Wardian may refer to:

People
Michael Wardian (born 1974), American marathoner and ultra-marathoner.

Places
Wardian London, a building in London, United Kingdom.

Other
Wardian case, a protective container for plants.